Ilya Konovalov may refer to: 

Ilya Konovalov (hammer thrower)
Ilya Konovalov (ice hockey)